Goodridge may refer to:

In places:
Goodridge, Alberta
Goodridge, Minnesota, a US city
Goodridge Township, Pennington County, Minnesota, USA

Other:
Goodridge v. Department of Public Health, a United States court case in the state of Massachusetts concerning same-sex marriage rights.

People with the given name Goodridge:
Goodridge (surname)